In computer science, a Boolean expression is an expression used in programming languages that produces a Boolean value when evaluated. A Boolean value is either true or false. A Boolean expression may be composed of a combination of the Boolean constants true or false, Boolean-typed variables, Boolean-valued operators, and Boolean-valued functions.

Boolean expressions correspond to propositional formulas in logic and are a special case of Boolean circuits.

Boolean operators
Most programming languages have the Boolean operators OR, AND and NOT; in C and some languages inspired by it, these are represented by "||" (double pipe character), "&&" (double ampersand) and "!" (exclamation point) respectively, while the corresponding bitwise operations are represented by "|", "&" and "~" (tilde).  In the mathematical literature the symbols used are often "+" (plus), "·" (dot) and overbar, or "∨" (vel), "∧" (et) and "¬" (not) or "′" (prime).

Some languages, e.g., Perl and Ruby, have two sets of Boolean operators, with identical functions but different precedence. Typically these languages use and, or and not for the lower precedence operators.

Some programming languages derived from PL/I have a bit string type and use BIT(1) rather than a separate Boolean type. In those languages the same operators serve for boolean operations and bitwise operations. The languages represent OR, AND, NOT and EXCLUSIVE OR by "|", "&", "¬" (infix) and "¬" (prefix).

Short-circuit operators

Some programming languages, e.g., Ada, have short-circuit Boolean operators. These operators use a lazy evaluation, that is, if the value of the expression can be determined from the left hand Boolean expression then they do not evaluate the right hand Boolean expression. As a result, there may be side effects that only occur for one value of the left hand operand.

Examples

typeof true and typeof false return 
Of course, most Boolean expressions will contain at least one variable, and often more.

See also
Expression (computer science)
Expression (mathematics)
Boolean function

References

External links
The Calculus of Logic, by George Boole, Cambridge and Dublin Mathematical Journal Vol. III (1848), pp. 183–98.

Boolean algebra
Operators (programming)